= 1971–72 Plunket Shield season =

Cricket tournament in New Zealand

1971–72 Plunket Shield
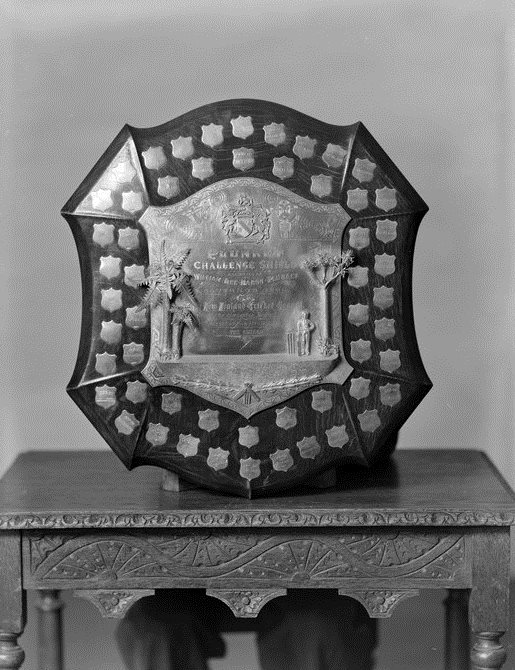
- The Plunket Shield trophy
- Cricket format: First-class
- Tournament format(s): Round-robin
- Champions: Otago (8th title)
- Participants: 6
- Matches: 15

The 1971–72 Plunket Shield season was a tournament of the Plunket Shield, the domestic first-class cricket competition of New Zealand.

Otago won the championship, finishing at the top of the points table at the end of the round-robin tournament between the six first-class sides, Auckland, Canterbury, Central Districts, Northern Districts, Otago and Wellington. Ten points were awarded for a win with one bonus point for every 25 runs over 150 and for every 2 wickets taken (in the first 65 overs only).

== Table ==
Below are the Plunket Shield standings for the season:

Team	Played	Won	Lost	Drawn	Bonus points		Points	Net RpW
Team	Played	Won	Lost	Drawn	Batting	Bowling	Points	Net RpW
Otago	5	4	0	1	3	18	61	18.499
Auckland	5	3	2	0	13	15	58	6.647
Canterbury	5	2	2	1	6	17	43	−0.641
Wellington	5	2	1	2	4	17	41	−1.130
Northern Districts	5	0	3	2	5	14	19	−8.944
Central Districts	5	0	3	2	4	12	16	−16.653
